Faloon is a surname. Notable people with the surname include:

William “Bill” Faloon (born 1954), founder of the Life Extension Foundation
Brian Faloon (born 1958), Northern Irish musician
Steve Faloon (born 1958), famous memory research subject under K. Anders Ericsson
William Faloon (born 1954), an author and life extensionist
Willie Faloon (born 1986), Northern Irish rugby union player

See also
Granfalloon, a fictional concept